Sir John Melton (died 1640) was an English merchant, writer and politician.

Melton was appointed Secretary to the Council of the North in 1635, by Charles I of England. He was elected Member of Parliament for Newcastle-upon-Tyne in the year of his death; it is unknown whether he has a connection to the Melton line of Aston, several members of which held the position of Lord Lucy.

Melton's works include A Six-Folde Politician (1609), and the satirical play Astrologaster (1620), against astrologers.

Sources

Notes

English dramatists and playwrights
English politicians
Year of birth missing
1640 deaths
Place of birth missing
English male dramatists and playwrights